Chomukha Bhairavji Temple is dedicated to Bhairava - an aspect of Shiva -  present in Jhunjhunu District of the Indian state of Rajasthan, India.

Worship
The people of Kharkhara and not only nearby places but from all over India places like Kolkata bihar ,mujhafarpur Bhilwara,surat, banglore,delhi,hariyana,dhanbad, hyderabad, even from abroad like Nepal Dubai worship Chomukha Bhairavji. In the month of magh sudi baras a huge mela organised , before baras on dashmi people take nishan yatra from sultana  and on gyaras  people come to temple for Jagran. Many people from all over the India donate to organize Jagran.

Renovation
In 2001, local people donated for the renovation of the temple. There are 6 big rooms, 1 kitchen and basic facilities available for devotees, all free of cost.

Connectivity
Although well connected by road, Kharkhara has no rail connection and a proper air connection.

Roadways
Kharkhara  is well connected by roads with all major cities like New Delhi, Jaipur, Narnaul. 
Private bus operators as well as state transport buses from other states ply to and from Singhana and Khetri daily. Taxi services are also available from destination like Jaipur, New Delhi.

Railways
The nearest railway station is Mahendragarh railway station at distance of 60 km. Many trains from Howrah, New Delhi, Bikaner connects Mahendragarh  
The temple  is located at a distance of 15 km from Singhana.

Air
Nearest international airports are Indira Gandhi International Airport, Delhi and Jaipur International Airport, Jaipur.

See also
List of Bhairava temples
Bhairava

References

Shiva temples in Rajasthan